Deben Mahata Government Medical College & Hospital  (Previously known as Purulia Government Medical College and Hospital) is a full-fledged tertiary referral Government Medical college. It was established in year 2020 at Purulia, in West Bengal. The college is affiliated to West Bengal University of Health Sciences and is recognised by the National Medical Commission. The Super Speciality hospital and Deben Mahata Sadar Hospital are associated with the medical College.There is Teaching and Non Teaching Staff Quarter, Resident's Quarter, Nurses Quarter situated in main campus.The Boy's and Girl's hostel are also present in main college campus.The annual MBBS intake is 100 from year 2020.

About college
The college imparts the degree Bachelor of Medicine and Surgery (MBBS). Nursing and para-medical courses are also offered. The college is affiliated to West Bengal University of Health Sciences and is recognized by the National Medical Commission. The hospital associated with the college is one of the largest hospitals in the Purulia.The Sadar Hospital is situated at couple of Kilometres away from medical college campus. The selection to the college is done on the basis of merit through National Eligibility cum Entrance Test. Yearly undergraduate student intake is 100 from the year 2020.

Courses
Deben Mahata Government Medical College, West Bengal undertakes education and training of students MBBS courses.The paramedical and B.Sc nursing courses are also offered.

See also
List of hospitals in India

References

External links 
 Official Website

2020 establishments in West Bengal
Affiliates of West Bengal University of Health Sciences
Educational institutions established in 2020
Medical colleges in West Bengal
Universities and colleges in Purulia district